Bilka is a Danish chain of hypermarkets.

Bilka (Bulgarian or Macedonian: билка, meaning herb; Ukrainian: білка, meaning squirrel) may also refer to:
 Bilka, Bulgaria, a village in Bulgaria
 , a village in Chernihiv Oblast, Ukraine

See also
Bilca
Belka (disambiguation)